Farnfold is a surname. Notable people with the surname include:

Thomas Farnfold (1600–1643), English politician
John Farnfold, MP for Bramber